Ramona is usually a feminine given name, the feminine form of Ramon (Spanish) and Raymond (Old German), meaning "wise protector". Today, it is used in Spain, Romania, the Republic of Moldova, Italy, and Portugal, and in some countries of Latin America and North America. It was made popular by the 19th century novel Ramona and by a series of Ramona children's books by Beverly Cleary.

The name Ramona was a popular first name for women (rank 296 of 4276) in the United States in 1960.

Notable people
Ramona (vocalist) (1909−1972), American 1930s cabaret singer and pianist
Comandante Ramona (died 2006), Mexican guerrilla leader of the Zapatista Army of National Liberation (EZLN)
Ramona Bachmann (born 1990), Swiss soccer player
Ramona Farcău (born 1979), Romanian handballer
Ramona Fradon (born 1926), American comic-book artist
Avril Ramona Lavigne (born 1984), Canadian singer, songwriter, and actress
Ramona Mănescu (born 1972), Romanian politician
Ramona Marquez (born 2001), British child actress
Ramona Shelburne (born 1979), American sportswriter and softball player
Ramona Young (born 1998), American actress
 Ramona Singer (born 1904) American TV personality and businesswoman

Fictional characters
Ramona, a rabbit marionette in the ITV Meridian children's TV series The Ark
Ramona, main character in the 1884 Ramona novel by Helen Hunt Jackson
Ramona, a recurring character in the TV series Santa Clarita Diet
Ramona Flowers, one of the protagonists in the Scott Pilgrim series
Ramona Gibbler, character in the main cast of the Netflix show, Fuller House, portrayed by Soni Bringas
Ramona Ortega, a main character in the 2002 Esperanza Rising novel by Pam Munoz Ryan
Ramona Quimby, main character in a series of children's stories by Beverly Cleary
Ramona Ramirez, Spanish nanny in the British TV series Cold Feet
Ramona Royale, character in the FX series American Horror Story: Hotel, portrayed by Angela Bassett
Ramona Badwolf, character of the fashion doll line and Netflix series Ever After High, portrayed by Cindy Robinson

References

English feminine given names
Spanish feminine given names
Romanian feminine given names
Italian feminine given names
Bulgarian feminine given names
Portuguese feminine given names